The ITV Proxima is a French single-place, paraglider that was designed by Xavier Demoury and produced by ITV Parapentes of Épagny, Haute-Savoie. It is now out of production.

Design and development
The Proxima was designed as a beginner glider. The models are each named for their approximate wing area in square metres.

Variants
Proxima 24
Extra small-sized model for lighter pilots. The glider model is CEN Standard certified.
Proxima 26
Small-sized model for lighter pilots. The glider model is CEN Standard certified.
Proxima 28
Mid-sized model for medium-weight pilots. The glider model is CEN Standard certified.
Proxima 31
Large-sized model for heavier pilots. The glider model is CEN Standard certified.

Specifications (Proxima 28)

References

Proxima
Paragliders